Putinga is a municipality in the state of Rio Grande do Sul, Brazil.  As of 2020, the estimated population was 3,889.

See also
List of municipalities in Rio Grande do Sul

References

 IBGE: Divisão Territorial do Brasil e Limites Territoriais (July 2008) 
 IBGE: Área territorial oficial 

Municipalities in Rio Grande do Sul